Heavy Smoke is the first fully produced album by DJ Concept. The album features Famoso, Koncept, Rap P, The Day Laborers, Chaundon, Joe Scudda, AC, Nutso, L.I.F.E. Long, Gab Gotcha, The Kid Daytona, Nature, T.Shirt & JR Mint.  The project officially launched in Amsterdam.  Limited edition CDs were available only in Amsterdam at the time of release.  DJ Concept will re-release the album with additional bonus songs.

Track listing

References

External links 
 
 

2011 albums
Hip hop albums by American artists